The Higher Institute of Agronomic Sciences of Chott Mariem is an Institution of Higher education in Tunisia. founded in 1975. It is under supervision of the Ministry of Agriculture (IRESA), and  the Ministry for Higher education and Scientific Research. It was founded in 1975 and is associated with the University of Sousse.

It offers preparatory courses, an undergraduate degree, and Master's and doctoral programs.

References

Education in Tunisia
Educational organisations based in Tunisia
Scientific organisations based in Tunisia
Universities in Tunisia
1975 establishments in Tunisia
Educational institutions established in 1975